FK Svit is a Slovak football team, based in the town of Svit. The club was founded in 1936.

References

External links 
at futbalovekluby.sk 

Svit
Association football clubs established in 1936
1936 establishments in Slovakia